Casey Kauffman is an American journalist who works for Al Jazeera English, the first English-language news channel headquartered in the Middle East.

Kauffman graduated from Stanford University in 2000 with a degree in political science, and in 2006 he joined Al-Jazeera English. As a reporter and cameraman, Kauffman has traveled to troubled locations throughout the world.

In October 2008, Kauffman's report about a rally in St. Clairesville, Ohio by supporters of Sarah Palin, Republican Party's vice-presidential candidate in the 2008 United States presidential election, created a controversy. In the rally, Palin's supporters made racist comments about Barack Obama, Democratic Party's presidential candidate, including the fear that Barack Obama is an anti-white Muslim terrorist. The story garnered massive attention. It had gone viral on the web and had been the source of a few editorials.

Colbert I. King, a columnist at The Washington Post, criticized the report and wrote a piece titled “A Rage No One Should Be Stoking”. In the article he said that “it is no accident that the English-language operation of Al-Jazeera, the Arab-language news network, tried to capture and broadcast to the Middle East, Africa and elsewhere a glimpse of America’s more sinister side... Was this fodder served up by Al-Jazeera to feed anti-American sentiment overseas? To be sure. But the camera didn’t lie. Did Al-Jazeera, however, record the whole truth?” 

Tony Burman, the managing director of Al Jazeera English, denied that Kauffman's report was anti-American and responded in a letter to the Washington Post that Al Jazeera's international news channels, both English and Arabic, have devoted “more air time to covering this campaign than perhaps any other network” and that the overarching story that America seemed poised to elect its first black president “reflects exceptionally well on Americans and its democracy”.

References

External links
 Misconceptions of Obama fuel Republican campaign - 13 Oct 08
 African-Americans discuss racism in the US - 18 Oct 08
 Listening Post - Debating race in the US - Oct 24 2008 Part 1

American male journalists
Stanford University alumni
Al Jazeera people
Living people
Year of birth missing (living people)